Stephan Gusche (born 13 February 1990) is a German former footballer.

References

External links

1990 births
Living people
German footballers
FC Hansa Rostock players
2. Bundesliga players
3. Liga players
Association football midfielders
Sportspeople from Schwerin